

Medalists

Heats

Semifinals

Final

60 metres at the World Athletics Indoor Championships
60 metres Men